Brigadier-General Augustus West Hill,  (4 May 1853 – 2 January 1921) was a British Army officer.

Military career
Hill was commissioned into the 57th (West Middlesex) Regiment of Foot on 1 January 1873. Following the 1881 Childers Reforms, the 57th merged with the 77th (East Middlesex), and became 2nd Battalion, the Middlesex Regiment; Hill commanded the battalion at the Battle of Spion Kop in January 1900, during the Second Boer War. He was subsequently mentioned in dispatches and appointed a Companion of the Order of the Bath for this action.

He became General Officer Commanding the Welsh Division in August 1908, shortly before retiring in January 1909. He lived at Beckington Castle in Somerset from 1896 until 1901.

Family
He married Alice Emma, and they had at least two sons, both of whom also became soldiers. Herbert (1880-1943), served in South Africa with his father, followed by the British Indian Army, and Gerald (1886-?), who joined the Royal Irish Fusiliers, and won a DSO in 1918.

References

Sources
 
 

1853 births
1921 deaths
Military personnel from the Isle of Wight
British Army brigadiers
Companions of the Order of the Bath
Middlesex Regiment officers
57th Regiment of Foot officers
British Army personnel of the Second Boer War